Triatomic molecules are molecules composed of three atoms, of either the same or different chemical elements. Examples include H2O, CO2 (pictured), HCN, O3 (ozone) and NO2.

Molecular vibrations

The vibrational modes of a triatomic molecule can be determined in specific cases.

Symmetric linear molecules 
A symmetric linear molecule ABA can perform:
 Antisymmetric longitudinal vibrations with frequency

 Symmetric longitudinal vibrations with frequency

 Symmetric transversal vibrations with frequency

In the previous formulas, M is the total mass of the molecule, mA and mB are the masses of the elements A and B, k1 and k2 are the spring constants of the molecule along its axis and perpendicular to it.

Types

Homonuclear

Homonuclear triatomic molecules contain three of the same kind of atom. That molecule will be an allotrope of that element.

Ozone, O3 is an example of a triatomic molecule with all atoms the same. Triatomic hydrogen, H3, is unstable and breaks up spontaneously. H3+, the trihydrogen cation is stable by itself and is symmetric. 4He3, the helium trimer is only weakly bound by van der Waals force and is in an Efimov state. Trisulfur (S3) is analogous to ozone.

Geometry
All triatomic molecules may be classified as possessing either a linear, bent, or cyclic geometry.

Linear
Linear triatomic molecules owe their geometry to their sp or sp3d hybridised central atoms. Well-known linear triatomic molecules include carbon dioxide (CO2) and hydrogen cyanide (HCN).

Xenon difluoride (XeF2) is one of the rare examples of a linear triatomic molecule possessing non-bonded pairs of electrons on the central atom.

Bent

Cyclic

References

External links

Molecular vibration